Dateline Diamonds is a 1965 British music film. The film was shot in black and white. It is an example of the "pop and cop" genre of film, which was popular in the UK during the early 1960s and was intended to present young musical talents to the teenage market. The film was a low-budget B movie and was released to support the main feature film Doctor in Clover, starring Leslie Phillips.

Plot

Major Fairclough is linked to an international criminal gang that uses the MV Galaxy (the ship which was the home of the pirate radio station Radio London) to smuggle stolen diamonds from the UK to Amsterdam. Fairclough blackmails Lester Benson, the fictitious manager of the Small Faces, into aiding and abetting his crimes.

Production

The film features the original lineup of the British band the Small Faces (Jimmy Winston was replaced in 1966 by Ian McLagan). The band's manager, Don Arden, arranged for the Small Faces to appear in the film as a promotional vehicle for "I've Got Mine", the follow-up to their debut hit single "Whatcha Gonna Do About It". However, the film's release was delayed and the band received no other publicity for the single, which failed to chart. The final sequence, showing Rey Anton and Pro Forma, Mark Richardson and the Small Faces performing on stage, was filmed during a genuine Radio London night at the Rank Ballroom in Watford. The film also features a young Kiki Dee and the British vocal group The Chantelles.

The film was made at Pinewood Studios and on location. A collection of location stills and corresponding contemporary photographs is hosted at reelstreets.com.

Dateline Diamonds has been released on VHS and DVD.

Cast list
William Lucas – Major Fairclough
Kenneth Cope – Lester Benson
George Mikell – Paul Verlekt
Conrad Phillips – Tom Jenkins
Patsy Rowlands – Mrs Edgecumbe
Burnell Tucker – Dale Meredith (a fictitious DJ)
Kenny Everett – Himself
Anna Carteret – Gay Jenkins
Vanda Godsell – Mrs Jenkins
Gertan Klauber – Meyerhof
Doel Luscombe – Assistant Commissioner
Peter Zander – Spankaren
Geoffrey Lumsden – Army Officer
Ronald Bridges – Garage Attendant
David Kirk – Dock Policeman
with brief appearances by Phillip Birch, Earl Richmond and Ben Toney

References

External links
Radio London: More information including photos on Dateline Diamonds
 

1966 films
1965 crime films
1965 musical films
1965 films
British musical films
Films set in London
Films set in Amsterdam
Films directed by Jeremy Summers
Films scored by Johnny Douglas
1960s English-language films
1960s British films